Nikolay (or Nikolai) Nikolaev Minev (8 November 1931 – 10 March 2017) was a Bulgarian chess International Master (IM) and noted chess author.

Minev was born on 8 November 1931, in Rousse, Bulgaria. He was awarded the IM title by FIDE in 1960. He was the champion of Bulgaria in 1953, 1965, and 1966. He played for Bulgaria in the Chess Olympiad six times (1954, 1956, 1958, 1960, 1962, and 1966). Minev's best international results were: third at Varna in 1960, second at Warsaw in 1961, а tie for first at Sombor in 1966, and second at Albena in 1975. He contributed to early editions of the Encyclopaedia of Chess Openings and the Encyclopaedia of Chess Endings (see Chess endgame literature). Minev and his wife emigrated to the United States in the mid-1980s and settled in Seattle, Washington. He was associated with  Grandmaster Yasser Seirawan and his magazine Inside Chess in the 1980s and 1990s.

He died on 10 March 2017 in Seattle.

Books

References

External links
 
 
 The Life & Career of Nikolay Minev
 Interview with Nikolay Minev

1931 births
2017 deaths
Bulgarian chess players
American chess players
Chess International Masters
American chess writers
American male non-fiction writers
People from Ruse, Bulgaria
Chess Olympiad competitors